Union Bridge Historic District is a national historic district at Union Bridge, Carroll County, Maryland, United States.  The district consists of this small piedmont village, which serves the area as a market center for the surrounding agricultural area. The greatest growth occurred in the 1880s after the Western Maryland Railway built its shops here.

It was added to the National Register of Historic Places in 1994.

See also
 Union Bridge Station - Historic railway station

References

External links
, including photo from 2006, at Maryland Historical Trust
Boundary Map of the Union Bridge Historic District, Carroll County, at Maryland Historical Trust

Historic districts in Carroll County, Maryland
Historic districts on the National Register of Historic Places in Maryland
Victorian architecture in Maryland
Union Bridge, Maryland
National Register of Historic Places in Carroll County, Maryland